Ivan Matetić Ronjgov (10 April 1880 – 27 June 1960) was an Istrian composer.

Ivan Matetić was born in Rojnići, a village in present-day Croatia, from which he took his nickname "Ronjgov". He discovered the pattern of the music of the Istrian region, theoretically explaining the essence of this natural music and pinpointed the "Istrian scale" – a series of six tones and half-tones.

On the basis of this discovery, Matetić was able to document the folk songs of the Istrian region, to harmonize their notes, and finally to compose music in the same spirit. He left a large number of musical notations from Istria and the Croatian seaside. He harmonized and arranged over one hundred songs. His most significant compositional opus consists of some ten major compositions for various vocal groups, mainly for mixed choirs.

Works such as "Ćaće moj" ("My Papa"), "Roženice", "Mantinjada domaćemu kraju" ("Ode to our Homeland"), "Na mamin gorbak" ("Beside Mama's grave") are choral symphonies composed by Matetić.

Sources

External links
 
 Ivan Matetić Ronjgov - Music School in Pula

Yugoslav composers
Croatian composers
People from Istria
1880 births
1960 deaths
Male classical composers
20th-century male musicians
1880 in Croatia